William C. Hazledine (May 18, 1833 - January 2, 1892) was a lawyer, state legislator and judge in Arkansas and then a lawyer and legislator in New Mexico.

He served on the Pulaski Chancery Court. He moved to New Mexico in 1875. He advocated for New Mexico to become a state. He also served as president of the New Mexico Bar Association in 1891. He died on January 2, 1892, in Albuquerque.

References

19th-century American politicians
19th-century American judges
19th-century American lawyers
Members of the Arkansas General Assembly
Members of the New Mexico Territorial Legislature
Politicians from Albuquerque, New Mexico
Place of birth unknown

1833 births
1892 deaths